Sarah Coburn (born August 4, 1977) is an American operatic soprano who was born in Petersburg, Virginia and is the daughter of former United States Senator from Oklahoma, Tom Coburn.
She graduated from Oklahoma State University and then received a Master of Music degree from Oklahoma City University, studying under Larry Wade Keller.

Coburn has an international career, singing in opera houses throughout the world.

Professional career
In the field of opera, she first achieved recognition in 2001 as a National Grand Finalist in the  Metropolitan Opera National Council Auditions.

Noted in Opera News magazine as a coloratura singer with a "silvery, resonant soprano" voice,
Coburn has performed leading roles at the Metropolitan Opera in New York; the Vienna State Opera; and other major companies.

In 2007 she succeeded Elizabeth Futral in the role of Princess Yue-Yang in the world premiere production of Tan Dun's The First Emperor at the Metropolitan.
That same year she performed the role of Kitty in the world premiere of David Carlson's Anna Karenina at the Florida Grand Opera.

Her repertoire has included the leading roles of: Lucia in both Donizetti's Lucia di Lammermoor and its French version, Lucie de Lammermoor at Glimmerglass Opera and Cincinnati Opera; Amina in Bellini's La sonnambula in Vienna;  Gilda in Verdi's Rigoletto at the Opéra de Montréal, Welsh National Opera, and Los Angeles Opera; the title role in Delibes' Lakmé at Tulsa Opera; Asteria in Handel's Tamerlano and Rosina in Rossini's Il barbiere di Siviglia, both with Los Angeles Opera.

In March 2014 she sang at the Washington National Opera as Adina in L'elisir d'amore by Gaetano Donizetti and, as part of the summer 2014 Tivoli Festival in Copenhagen, she sang the role of Elvira in I Puritani.

References

External links

Fletcher Artist Management website

1977 births
Living people
American operatic sopranos
Singers from Oklahoma
Oklahoma State University alumni
Oklahoma City University alumni
People from Petersburg, Virginia
Singers from Virginia
21st-century American women opera singers
Winners of the Metropolitan Opera National Council Auditions
Classical musicians from Virginia